= Sexuality and Gender in Post-Communist Eastern Europe and Russia =

2004 book

- Editor: Aleksandar Štulhofer and Theo Sandfort
- Language: English
- Genre: Non-fiction
- Publisher: Routledge
- Publication date: 2004
- ISBN: 978-0789022936

Sexuality and Gender in Post-Communist Eastern Europe and Russia is a book edited by Aleksandar Štulhofer and Theo Sandfort. It was published by Routledge in 2004.
